Jean Madeleine Marie Schneitzhöeffer (13 October 1785 – 14 October 1852) was a French composer.

Life
Born in Toulouse, Schneitzhöeffer was a student of Charles Simon Catel at the Conservatoire de Paris. He won second prize for piano in 1803 and then joined the Opéra as a timpanist in 1815, where (seven years later) he was made chef de chant. Made a professor of choral singing at the Conservatoire, he was granted the Legion of Honour in 1840. He died in Paris.

Works
He composed several ballet scores for the Opéra de Paris, including :
 Mars et Vénus
 Le Sicilien
 Proserpine (1818)
 Le Séducteur au village (1818)
 Zémire et Azor (1824)
 Les Filets de Vulcain (1826)
 La Sylphide, for Marie Taglioni (1832)
 La Tempête (1834)

Musicians from Toulouse
1785 births
1852 deaths
19th-century classical composers
French ballet composers
French classical composers
French male classical composers
Recipients of the Legion of Honour
19th-century French male musicians